The Fall of the Rebel Angels is an oil painting by the Italian late Baroque artist Luca Giordano, painted in  1666, and now exhibited at the Kunsthistorisches Museum, Vienna. Its dimensions are 419 × 283 cm.

History and description
The work was most probably performed during the Venetian period of Giordano and the two strongest influences that the Neapolitan painter had during his life are evident in the canvas. The lower part of the painting, characterized by the presence of the demons defeated by the archangel Michael, shows a clear rebellious imprint in the chiaroscuro features of the scene; while the upper part, characterized by the figure of the saint, shows evident influences of Venetian painting.

The image of Saint Michael mirrors that of classical iconography, showing its spread wings, with a sword, with a heavenly dress and a red cape; intent on expelling the demons that came from the underworld on the earth. The only differences that there are with another painting to the same subject, always performed by Giordano a few years earlier (1663) and now kept at the Gemäldegalerie of Berlin, is that in this work of Vienna's saint is portrayed holding a sword instead of a lance and that his head is uncovered without helmet.

Notes

Bibliography
 Luca Giordano, 1634-1705, Editrice Electa (2001)

External links
 

 

1666 paintings
Paintings by Luca Giordano
Paintings depicting Michael (archangel)
Paintings in the collection of the Kunsthistorisches Museum